Napier was an electorate in the South Australian Legislative Assembly in the outer northern suburbs of the Adelaide metropolitan area, including the suburbs of Blakeview, Davoren Park, Elizabeth Downs, Evanston South, Kudla, Munno Para, Smithfield and Smithfield Plains, parts of Craigmore, Evanston Park and Munno Para Downs; as well as semi-rural Bibaringa, One Tree Hill, Sampson Flat, Uleybury and Yattalunga, and part of Humbug Scrub.

Napier was named after Sir Mellis Napier, who was Chief Justice of South Australia for 25 years and a total of 43 years in the Supreme Court.

Though typically a safe Labor seat, at the 1993 election landslide Napier was Labor's most marginal seat on a 1.1 percent margin.

Napier ceased to exist at the 2018 state election. because of a redistribution in 2016. Some of the more central urbanized area of Napier east of the Main North Road was merged with Little Para which was renamed Elizabeth. The portion west of Main North Road was transferred to Taylor and Light. The eastern rural portions became part of King, which the Boundaries Commission reported as the renaming of Napier. The last member for Napier, Jon Gee, transferred to Taylor.

Members for Napier

Election results

Notes

References
 ABC profile for Napier: 2014
 ECSA profile for Napier: 2014
 Poll Bludger profile for Napier: 2014

1977 establishments in Australia
Electoral districts of South Australia